Charles Hodgson Fowler (2 March 1840 – 14 December 1910) was a prolific English ecclesiastical architect who specialised in building and, especially, restoring churches.

Life
He was born in Nottinghamshire, the son of Robert Hodgson Fowler (1798-1858) the vicar of Holy Trinity Church, Rolleston and Frances Elizabeth Bish (1802-1872).

Career
In the early 1860s, following an apprenticeship with Sir George Gilbert Scott, he commenced work in Pimlico, London, and became an Associate of the Royal Institute of British Architects (RIBA) in 1863.  His proposers were Scott, E. W. Pugin and Matthew Digby Wyatt.  In 1864, he moved to Durham, where he lived for the rest of his life.

Fowler's initial appointment in Durham was as Clerk of Works at Durham Cathedral in succession to E.R. Robson.  In 1870 he became a Fellow of the RIBA.  At various times, he held the position of Architect to Rochester Cathedral and Lincoln Cathedral, and Architect to the Diocese of York and the Diocese of Lincoln.   From 1885 to the time of his death, he was Architect to the Dean and Chapter of Durham, a post that had previously been held by Sir George Gilbert Scott.

Almost all of Fowler's work was done in four counties:  County Durham, Yorkshire, Lincolnshire and Nottinghamshire.

Designs

Although much of Fowler's work involved restoring and enlarging buildings, he was the architect of a number of new or rebuilt churches.  A representative sample in a book on Victorian architecture is as follows:

Holy Innocents, Tudhoe, County Durham (1866)
St Ives, Leadgate, County Durham (1868)
St Edmund, Bearpark, County Durham (1879)
St Paul, West Hartlepool, County Durham (1885)
St Barnabas, Middlesbrough, North Yorkshire (1888)
St Peter, Norton-on-Derwent, North Yorkshire (1894)
Christ Church, Hepple, Northumberland (1897)
St Alban, Ordsall, Retford, Nottinghamshire (1901)

Other notable churches by Fowler include:

St Mary's Church, South Hylton, Sunderland (1880)
St. Helen's Church, Grove, Nottinghamshire (1882)
St Andrew's Church, Bishopthorpe, City of York (1898–1902)
St Mark's Church, Oldcotes 1900
All Saints' Church, Lincoln 1903

Restorations

Among Fowler's restorations were the following:

St Mary's Church, Clifton, Nottinghamshire (1874)
St Wilfrid's Church, Kelham, Nottinghamshire (1874)
St John's Church, Shildon, County Durham  (1881–82, tower 1900)
All Saints' Church, Northallerton (1882–85)
Holy Trinity Church, Acaster Malbis, North Yorkshire (1886)
Church of St Peter at Gowts, Lincoln (1887) enlargement of the chancel
All Hallows Church, Clixby, Lincolnshire (1889)
Holy Trinity Church, Rolleston, Nottinghamshire (1889)
St Mary's Church, Scawton, North Yorkshire (1892)
St Peter and St Paul's Church, Upton, Newark and Southwell, Nottinghamshire (1893)
All Saints' Church, Strelley 1895
Church of St Mary the Virgin, Richmond, North Yorkshire (1897)
St Peter, Langtoft, East Riding of Yorkshire (1900–03)
Holy Trinity Church, Micklegate, York (1900–05) 
St Peter and St Paul's Church, Sturton-le-Steeple (1901–02)
St Mary, Fridaythorpe, East Riding of Yorkshire (1902–03)
St Peter's Church, Snelston Derbyshire (1906–07)
St Leonard’s Church, Malton, North Yorkshire (1907)
St Hilda, Sherburn, North Yorkshire (1909–1913)

Reordering

Church of St Thomas the Apostle, Killinghall (1905-1908) reordering of chancel in this 1880 building
Church of All Saints, Winterton, Lincolnshire (1903-1904)

Opinions on Fowler's work

The introductions to some of the volumes in the Buildings of England series offer a range of opinions on the merits of Fowler's restorations and, sometimes, his new or rebuilt churches:

"Charles Hodgson Fowler, clerk of works then architect to the Dean and Chapter [of Durham Cathedral], composed the usual red brick and lancet windows to great effect in his big town churches (St Paul, West Hartlepool 1885-6; St Ignatius, Hendon (Sunderland) 1889), and barn-like colliery ones (Bearpark 1877-9; Craghead 1914–21; Easington Colliery 1925-8).  Between 1864 and 1895 he did a vast number of restorations, handling them sensitively but not slavishly (see the staircase at Ryton, 1886)."
"From outside the county, C. H. Fowler ... also restored much, with a similar dead hand"
"Hodgson Fowler was more sensitive [as a church restorer than Ewan Christian] (see also his new churches at Grove, 1882, St Alban Ordsall, 1901) ..."
" ... C. Hodgson Fowler of Durham (who did an admirably tactful restoration at Scawton in 1892) ..."
"C. Hodgson Fowler did some pleasant village churches (Burton Leonard, 1877-8; Bishop Monkton, 1878-9)"

References

External links

 For additional biographical and business details, see the entry for Charles Hodgson Fowler in the Dictionary of Scottish Architects 1660-1980 (DSA)
 Flickr: portrait of Charles Hodgson Fowler in stained glass at St Oswald's Church, Durham

19th-century English architects
Gothic Revival architects
English ecclesiastical architects
1840 births
1910 deaths
Architects of cathedrals
Architects from Nottinghamshire